One Shot Ross is a 1917 American silent Western film directed by Clifford Smith and starring Roy Stewart, Josie Sedgwick and Jack Richardson.

Cast
 Roy Stewart as 'One Shot' Ross
 Josie Sedgwick as Nan Sheridan
 Jack Richardson as Jim Butler
 Louis Durham as Shorty
 William Ellingford as Mr. Sheridan
 Leo Willis as Briggs

References

Bibliography
 Rainey, Buck. Sweethearts of the Sage: Biographies and Filmographies of 258 actresses appearing in Western movies. McFarland & Company, 1992.

External links
 

1917 films
1917 Western (genre) films
American black-and-white films
Triangle Film Corporation films
Films directed by Clifford Smith
Silent American Western (genre) films
1910s English-language films
1910s American films